På tro og love is a 1955 Danish family film directed by Torben Anton Svendsen and starring Poul Reichhardt.

Cast
 Poul Reichhardt as Hans
 Astrid Villaume as Grete
 Helge Kjærulff-Schmidt as Georg
 Gunnar Lauring as Chefen
 Helle Virkner as Vera Gimmer
 Lis Løwert as Solveig
 Ove Sprogøe as Henry
 Sigrid Horne-Rasmussen as Fru Gimmer
 Louis Miehe-Renard as Frederiksen
 Einar Juhl as Revisor
 Carl Johan Hviid as Portieren
 Birgit Sadolin as Telefonpige
 Else Kornerup as Kontordame
 Mogens Lind as Speaker
 Edith Hermansen as Klinikassistent

References

External links

1955 films
1950s Danish-language films
Danish black-and-white films
Best Danish Film Bodil Award winners
Films with screenplays by Erik Balling
Danish comedy films
1955 comedy films